Tyrone may refer to:

 Kingdom of Tyrone or Tír Eoghain, a kingdom of Gaelic Ireland
 County Tyrone, a county in Northern Ireland
 Earl of Tyrone, a title in the Peerage of Ireland
 Tyrone (name), a male given name

Places

Canada
 Tyrone, Ontario

Ireland
 Tyrone (Parliament of Ireland constituency)
 Tyrone (UK Parliament constituency)

United States 
 Tyrone, Colorado
 Tyrone, Georgia 
 Tyrone, Iowa
 Tyrone, Kentucky
 Tyrone, Missouri
 Tyrone, New Mexico
 Tyrone (ghost town), New Mexico
 Tyrone, New York
 Tyrone, Coshocton County, Ohio
 Tyrone, Morrow County, Ohio
 Tyrone, Oklahoma
 Tyrone, Pennsylvania
 Tyrone (Amtrak station)
 Tyrone, West Virginia
 Tyrone, Wisconsin
 Tyrone Township, Michigan (disambiguation)
 Tyrone Township, Pennsylvania (disambiguation)

Other uses
 Tyrone GAA, a county board of the Gaelic Athletic Association
 Tyrone county football team
 "Tyrone" (song), a song by Erykah Badu

English masculine given names